U pokladny stál...  is a Czechoslovak comedy film. It was released in 1939. The cast included Vlasta Burian, Jaroslav Marvan, Adina Mandlová, Čeněk Šlégl, Marie Blažková, Václav Trégl, Ladislav Hemmer, Karel Postranecký, and František Filipovský.

External links
 

1939 films
1939 comedy films
Czechoslovak comedy films
Czechoslovak black-and-white films
1930s Czech films
1930s Czech-language films